Corrugator may refer to:
 Corrugator supercilii muscle, a small, narrow, pyramidal muscle close to the eye
 Corrugator cutis ani muscle, after the anatomist George Viner Ellis
 Machinery used to manufacture corrugated fiberboard used in boxes
 Machine which is used to produce corrugated stainless steel tubing

See also 
 Corrugated (disambiguation)